Serra da Boa Viagem is a mountain range in Portugal, it lies three kilometers north of Figueira da Foz. In its westernmost point lies Cabo Mondego.

References

Mountain ranges of Portugal
Estrela
Geography of Coimbra District
Figueira da Foz